Conus venulatus, common name the Cape Verde cone, is a species of sea snail, a marine gastropod mollusk in the family Conidae, the cone snails and their allies.

Like all species within the genus Conus, these snails are predatory and venomous. They are capable of "stinging" humans, therefore live ones should be handled carefully or not at all.

Description
The size of the shell varies between 27 mm and 55 mm. The color of the shell varies from light chestnut to dark chocolate, with indistinct darker revolving lines, irregularly marbled throughout with white. The spire and lower part of the body whorl are striate.

Distribution
This species occurs in the Atlantic Ocean off the Cape Verde Islands.

Gallery

References

 Lamarck, J. B. P. A., 1810. Description des espèces du genre Cône. Annales du Muséum d'Histoire Naturelle 15: 263–292

External links
 The Conus Biodiversity website
 Cone Shells – Knights of the Sea
 
 Holotype in MNHN, Paris

venulatus
Gastropods described in 1792
Gastropods of Cape Verde
Endemic fauna of Cape Verde